Operation Phoenix or Phenix may refer to:

Military
 Phoenix Program, CIA military, intelligence, and internal security program during the Vietnam War
 Vela incident, alleged 1979 Israeli-South African nuclear test that was supposedly codenamed "Operation Phenix"
 Project Phoenix (South Africa), SANDF project to revitialise the Reserve Force
 Operation Phoenix (South Africa), South African response to mass SWAPO infiltration of South-West Africa
 2008 Colombian raid into Ecuador, codenamed Operación Fénix (Operation Phoenix)
 Operation Phoenix (1966), Vietnam War military operation, February 1966 in Biên Hòa Province
 Operation Phoenix (1995), Croatian Army defence of Slavonia during Operation Storm

Other
 Operation Phoenix (railway), Victorian Railways post-war rebuilding project commenced in 1950
 Operation Phoenix (album), album by Good Riddance
 Operation Phoenix (game expansion), a game add-on for Counter-Strike: Global Offensive